The soricine brucie (Brucepattersonius soricinus) is a rodent species from South America. It is found in Brazil.

References

Brucepattersonius
Mammals described in 1998
Taxa named by Philip Hershkovitz